Eric Shannon Moulds (born July 17, 1973) is an American former professional football player who was a wide receiver for 12 seasons in the National Football League (NFL). He played college football for Mississippi State University and was drafted by the Buffalo Bills 24th overall in the 1996 NFL Draft. In 2009, Moulds (affectionately called E-Money for short) was one of three receivers named to the Buffalo Bills 50th Anniversary All-Time Team.

College career
At Mississippi State University, Moulds caught 117 passes for 2,022 yards (averaging 17.1 per catch). He ranks fifth in yards and fourth in touchdowns on Mississippi State's career receiving list.  1993, he had 17 catches for 398 yards and 4 TD while being utilized as a vertical receiver.  In 1994, he had 39 catches for 845 yards and 7 TD.  He followed that up in 1995 with 62 catches for 779 yards and 6 TD.

In 1994, Moulds led the NCAA Division I-A in kickoff returns with a 32.8 yds/return average.

In 1995 Gabe Harris impersonated Eric Moulds for the Auburn scout team.

Professional career

Buffalo Bills
Moulds was the Bills' first round draft pick (24th overall) in 1996. For his first two seasons, Moulds was stuck on the depth chart behind receivers Andre Reed and Quinn Early.

Moulds finally had his breakout season in 1998, where set a single-season team record with 1,368 receiving yards, a total that led the AFC and was second in the league. Moulds also has the Bills' second-highest single-season total, with 1,326 in 2002. That record would stand until 2020, when Stefon Diggs would earn a total of 1,535 yards. Moulds's 20.4 yards per catch was second in the NFL in 1998.

In his eight seasons as the number one receiver for the Bills (1998-2005), Moulds had 626 receptions for 8,523 yards, an average of 78.25 catches and 1,065 yards per season. Moulds's yardage was 7th-most in the NFL over that span.

In 2002, Moulds became the first player in Bills history to log 100 receptions in a single season, until Stefon Diggs broke the record in 2020 with 127.

In the playoffs, Moulds had an NFL playoff record 240 receiving yards against the Miami Dolphins, though he notably lost a fumble on the Bills' first play, a 65-yard pass from Doug Flutie. Buffalo lost 24-17.

Moulds established himself as one of the premier receivers in football in the late 1990s and early 2000s, amassing 764 career receptions and being selected to three Pro Bowls (1998, 2000, 2002).

2006 and 2007 seasons
On April 4, 2006, Moulds was traded to the Houston Texans, in exchange for their fifth round draft pick in the 2006 NFL Draft, which the Bills would eventually use on future All-Pro defensive tackle Kyle Williams. Moulds was released from the Texans after the 2006 season. After his release, Moulds criticized then-Texans quarterback David Carr, saying "[t]he quarterback has to show that he can carry [the team]."

The Tennessee Titans signed Moulds on July 25, 2007, and at the beginning of the season he had earned a starting position. Moulds played in all 16 games in 2007, having the 4th most receptions on his team, 2nd most by wide receivers, with 32 catches for 342 yards. The Titans released Moulds after the 2007 season.

NFL career statistics

References

External links
 
 

1973 births
Living people
American football wide receivers
Mississippi State Bulldogs football players
Buffalo Bills players
Houston Texans players
Tennessee Titans players
American Conference Pro Bowl players
People from Lucedale, Mississippi
Players of American football from Mississippi
African-American players of American football
21st-century African-American sportspeople
20th-century African-American sportspeople